Ján Lašák (born April 10, 1979) is a Slovak former professional ice hockey goaltender.

Lašák was drafted by the Nashville Predators of the National Hockey League (NHL) in the 2nd round (65th overall) of the 1999 NHL Entry Draft and spent the following four seasons in North America before returning to Europe in 2003.

Playing career
After Lašák was drafted by the Predators, he moved to North America and spent his first professional season with the Hampton Roads Admirals of the East Coast Hockey League (ECHL). He had a stellar debut, posting a 36-17-4 record, and was named ECHL Rookie of the Year and Goaltender of the Year, as well as to the All-Rookie and First All-Star teams. He spent the majority of the following three seasons with Nashville's top minor league affiliate, the Milwaukee Admirals of the International Hockey League. He posted a 53-49-12 record with Milwaukee, earning some limited action with the Predators. However, he was unable to earn a permanent spot with the Predators, appearing in only 6 games for the team, and posting an 0-4 record.

Due to his inability to stick with the Predators, Lašák decided to return to Europe and spent the 2003-04 season with SKA St. Petersburg of the Russian Super League. The following year Lašák moved to the Czech Republic to play with HC Pardubice of the Czech Extraliga, the team with which he would spend the next five seasons. He enjoyed much success with Pardubice, posting a 116-85-5 record and leading them to the league championship in 2004-05.

Following his successful stint in the Czech Extraliga, Lašák spent the 2009-10 season with Atlant Mytishchi of the Kontinental Hockey League. He posted an 11-6-4 record as the team bowed out in the first round of the playoffs. He also spent part of the season on loan to HC Košice of the Slovak Extraliga, appearing in 17 games for the club.

Lašák signed a one-year contract with Jokerit of the Finnish SM-liiga for the 2010-11 season. He posted a 14-11 record along with a .923 save percentage during the regular season, and despite his efforts including a .940 save percentage and 1.94 goals against average, Jokerit lost its quarterfinal series to HIFK.

In 2011 Lašák returned to the KHL and signed for Amur Khabarovsk.

International play
Lašák has been a longtime mainstay of the Slovak national team. He has appeared in nine IIHF World Championships, two Winter Olympic Games, and one World Cup of Hockey for Slovakia. He backstopped Slovakia to its first and to date only gold medal at the 2002 IIHF World Championship in Sweden, while also helping his country capture silver at the 2000 IIHF World Championship and bronze at the 2003 IIHF World Championship.

Career statistics

Awards and honors

External links
 
 Ján Lašák on Facebook

1979 births
Living people
Amur Khabarovsk players
Hampton Roads Admirals players
Atlant Moscow Oblast players
HC Bílí Tygři Liberec players
HC Košice players
HC Dynamo Pardubice players
HC Spartak Moscow players
Ice hockey players at the 2002 Winter Olympics
Ice hockey players at the 2006 Winter Olympics
Jokerit players
Milwaukee Admirals players
Nashville Predators draft picks
Nashville Predators players
Olympic ice hockey players of Slovakia
Sportspeople from Zvolen
SKA Saint Petersburg players
Slovak expatriate ice hockey players in Russia
Slovak ice hockey goaltenders
Slovakia men's national ice hockey team coaches
Slovak expatriate ice hockey players in the United States
Slovak expatriate ice hockey players in Finland